The Missouri and North Arkansas Depot is a historic railroad station at Center Street and Cash Streets in Bellefonte, Arkansas.  It is a small single-story structure with a wide low-pitch gable-on-hip roof and a rubble-stone exterior over a wood frame.  A small shed-roof addition enlarges the building slightly to the north, while a larger cross-gable addition projects from the rear.  It was built in 1901 by the Missouri and North Arkansas Railroad to serve the area's passenger traffic.  It is a rare example of rubble-over-frame construction for railroad stations in the region.

The building was listed on the National Register of Historic Places in 1992.

See also
National Register of Historic Places listings in Boone County, Arkansas

References

Railway stations on the National Register of Historic Places in Arkansas
Railway stations in the United States opened in 1901
Transportation in Boone County, Arkansas
National Register of Historic Places in Boone County, Arkansas
1901 establishments in Arkansas
Former railway stations in Arkansas